The Central University of Nicaragua (Spanish: Universidad Central de Nicaragua, UCN) is an private university in Nicaragua. 

Founded in 1998, UCN has been accredited and recognized by the Nicaraguan Ministry of Education, and has also been internationally accredited by the UK-based Accreditation Service for International Colleges and Universities (ASIC).

Division of International and European Programs
On 22 March 2012, the UCN signed in Managua an agreement with the United Mahatma Gandhi University in India, Universidad de Cundinamarca in Colombia, Universidad de la Salle in Costa Rica, 3G University in the UAE, Fundación Universitaria Samuel Hahnemann in Colombia and Universidad Azteca in Mexico to issue degrees externally through the institutions. UCN also offers an EdD-PhD programme in Innsbruck, Austria. 

UCN also collaborates with Texila American University, Guyana, to provide distance learning programs. In Nicaragua, it has 3 locations hosting 6,473 on-campus students and 4,251 distance learning students as of 2014.

Faculties and programs
The university offers courses in medicine, pharmacy, business, law, social science, engineering, veterinary medicine, and psychology.

References

External links
 Universidad Central de Nicaragua
 Universidad Central de Nicaragua international programs
 School of Environmental and Waste Management

Distance education institutions
Educational institutions established in 1998
Universities in Nicaragua
1998 establishments in Nicaragua
Distance education institutions based in Nicaragua